Rubber pollution, similar to plastic pollution, occurs in various environments, and originates from a variety of sources, ranging from the food industry processing chain to tire wear. Synthetic and natural rubber dust and fragments now occur in food, airborne as particulates in air pollution, hidden in the earth as soil pollution, and in waterways, lakes and the sea.

Causes

Tire wear is a major source of rubber pollution.
A concern is that, unlike exhaust emissions, vehicle tire wear pollution is not regulated.
Some devices are nonetheless being developed in an effort to reduce the amount of particulates coming from the tire and otherwise ending up in the atmosphere.
Although not immediately visible to the naked eye, tire dust makes up a significant portion of road debris.

Other sources can be artificial turf and rubber O-rings and seals.

Classification
Very fine rubber dust particles can depending on the classification be counted among microplastic (because rubber is just another polymer) or separately (because its constituent monomers, the required additives, and the type of chemical bond mesh is slightly different). In a similar vein, rubber pollution is often implicitly mentioned when plastic pollution is addressed.

6PPD-quinone, an antiozonant used in rubber tires, has been found to kill salmon when it accumulates into waterways from tire wear pollution.

See also
Carbonyl sulfide
Hydrofuramide
Tire recycling

References

Rubber industry
Pollution